William Procter Jr. (May 3, 1817 – February 10, 1874) was an American pharmacist. He graduated from the Philadelphia College of Pharmacy in 1837. He is known for his role in establishing the American Pharmacists Association and his work on the United States Pharmacopeia. He was the author/editor of the first pharmacy textbook published in America. He is generally regarded as the Father of American Pharmacy.

Procter served in an era when pharmacy was a wide open, unregulated field.  Anyone could sell drugs.  Drug kits were supplied by jobbers.  Drugs were sold by general stores, by physicians, or by almost anyone with no training required.  In addition to drugs, drug stores sold a variety of materials including chemicals, dyes, poisons like arsenic, and even paints and oils.  Most drugs came from botanicals, but importers had no way to assess quality.

Procter entered the field through an apprenticeship with Henry M. Zollickoffer in 1831 in Philadelphia.  Elias Durand, a nearby pharmacist trained in France, encouraged Procter to pursue investigations.   He attended the Philadelphia College of Pharmacy graduating in 1837.  In 1844, he opened a shop of his own.  Rather than a soda fountain, his shop included a laboratory and a writing area where he wrote scientific papers, practical articles, and editorials.  He investigated a series of volatile oils.  He experimented with new methods and apparatus.  Results were published in the American Journal of Pharmacy. 

Assay of drugs became a specialty.  Wholesalers paid for analysis before accepting a shipment.  Imported drug materials could vary widely in quality.  Drugs rejected in Europe were sometimes shipped to America.  Unethical vendors extended their wares by adding inerts like sawdust.  The Pharmacopeia of the United States was created to establish standards for drug quality.  The first edition was published in 1820.  Procter participated in the 1840 revision of the Pharmacopeia.  Later the committee hired him as a consultant.  The faculty of the Philadelphia College of Pharmacy assisted.  The Pharmacopeia (and the National Formulary) were adopted as official standards in the Food and Drug Act of 1906.

In the 1850s companies began to manufacture drug preparations that previously were prepared by hand by druggists.  Concerns arose that commercial preparations could deviate from those in the Pharmacopeia causing variations in effects.  The government imposed excise taxes on alcohol during the Civil War.  Alcohol was commonly used in preparations.  Higher costs favored manufactured drugs.  Licenses required for medicinal alcohol caused pharmacies to add liquor sales.  Customers for liquor also bought tobacco products.    

Procter was named editor of the journal in 1848.  The journal was founded as the Journal of the Philadelphia College of Pharmacy in 1825.  The name was changed to The American Journal of Pharmacy in 1835.  Similar journals originated in Philadelphia, including the American Journal of Medical Science from 1818 and the Journal of the Franklin Institute from 1824.  Procter  served as editor until 1870.  He added abstracts of articles published in Britain and France.  The Civil War stressed the finances of the journal as Southerners stopped subscribing.  Trimming costs by reducing the number of pages and financial assistance from the college helped it survive.  

Procter played a key role in the founding of the American Pharmaceutical Association in 1851.  He lobbied for it through editorials in the American Journal of Pharmacy.  

Procter became professor of practical and theoretical pharmacy at the college in 1846.  He believed apprenticeships were the best way to train pharmacists.  Lectures were held for apprentices in the evening from October through February.  His lectures covered pharmacy techniques such as maceration, percolation and distillation followed by a discussion of drugs and preparations.  He continued at the college for almost 20 years, resigning in 1866.  He returned to the position in 1872 after the death of Edward Parrish.  Procter died in 1874 shortly after completing a lecture at the college.

Initially there were no textbooks.  That changed in 1847 with the arrival of one from Germany: Lehrbuch der pharmaceutischen Technik by Karl Friedrich Mohr.  In England, Theophilus Redwood translated Mohr's book and adapted it to English practice resulting in Practical Pharmacy, which arrived in the US in 1848.  Procter edited an American edition for publisher Lea and Blanchard of Philadelphia.  The result was a major re-write adding about one third to the book.  Procter's Practical Pharmacy was published in 1849.  An Introduction to Practical Pharmacy by Edward Parrish, from the same publishers in 1855 became the standard.

The transition from apprenticeships to training in schools of pharmacy was controversial.  Procter continued to believe apprenticeship followed by school gave the best results.  The University of Michigan undertook the opposite approach in 1867.  Working through the Alumni Association, the College set up a practical pharmacy laboratory in 1870.  It was well accepted and became part of the College in 1872.

Pharmacy laws to regulate who could practice pharmacy were under discussion at the American Pharmaceutical Association in 1868.  The association drafted a model law for consideration by state legislatures.  Without regulation, they thought pharmacists would be inadequately trained.  

A prominent figure is Edward R. Squibb, who manufactured drugs in Brooklyn, NY.  He was well respected in the pharmaceutical industry for his commitment to quality.  He was a friend of Procter and participated in numerous discussions.

Procter was honored with a life-sized statue at the headquarters of the American Pharmaceutical Association in 1941.

See also
 List of pharmacists

References

1817 births
1874 deaths
American pharmacists
People from Baltimore
University of the Sciences alumni